Margaret Chelimo Kipkemboi (born 9 February 1993) is a Kenyan long-distance runner. She won the silver medal for the 5000 metres at the 2019 World Championships, and a bronze in the 10,000 metres at the 2022 World Championships. Kipkemboi took silver over 5000m at the 2018 Commonwealth Games.

Competition record

Personal bests
 3000 metres – 8:21.53 (Paris 2021)
 5000 metres – 14:27.12 (Brussels 2021)
 10,000 metres – 30:10.07 (Eugene, OR 2022)
Road
 5 km – 14:32 (Zürich 2021)
 10 km – 29:50 (Valencia 2021)
 Half marathon – 65:26 (Barcelona 2022)

References

External links

1993 births
Living people
Kenyan female long-distance runners
World Athletics Championships athletes for Kenya
World Athletics Championships medalists
People from Nandi County
Kenyan female cross country runners
Commonwealth Games medallists in athletics
Commonwealth Games silver medallists for Kenya
Athletes (track and field) at the 2018 Commonwealth Games
African Games medalists in athletics (track and field)
African Games gold medalists for Kenya
Athletes (track and field) at the 2015 African Games
21st-century Kenyan women
Medallists at the 2018 Commonwealth Games